Avalukku Aayiram Kangal is a Tamil language film released in 1975. It starred Jayalalithaa in the lead role, opposite Ravichandran and Jaishankar. It is noted for being the last film in which Jayalalithaa shared screen-pace with both the heroes, who were regularly paired opposite her since 1966. The music was provided by T. K. Ramamoorthy. It was a successful film on its release.

Plot

Cast 
Jaishankar
 Ravichandran
Jayalalitha
P. R. Varalakshmi
M. R. R. Vasu
Cho

Soundtrack 

The music was composed by T. K. Ramamoorthy.
"Pathutharam" -
"Thangam Naan" -
"Ore Aayiram" -

References

External links 
 

1970s Tamil-language films
1975 films
Films directed by T. R. Ramanna
Films scored by T. R. Pappa
Films with screenplays by Mahendran (filmmaker)